TAM 110 T7 B/BV is a general purpose off-road lorry made by Yugoslav (today Slovenian) vehicle manufacturer Tovarna avtomobilov Maribor (TAM). The four-wheel drive lorry is designed for transport of personnel, weapons and material as for traction of weapons and trailer up to 2.5 tons of weight (1.5 off-road) for the needs of the  Yugoslav People's Army.

Development
During 1965 the Department for Traffic of Federal Secretariat of People's Defense has formed work group with task to analyzes the unarmored vehicles of Yugoslav People's Army. the result of work group was the Study of non-combat vehicles and trailers in use with Yugoslav People's Army. The inferences of study were adopted by Main Military Technical Council in 1966. The study has concluded that there are 129 different vehicle marks in 320 types in service. A decision was made to reduce number of different vehicle marks in service by development of five vehicle classes: 0,75 tons 4x4 off-road vehicle, 1.5 tons 4x4 off-road truck, 3 tons 6x6 off-road truck, 6 tons 6x6 off-road truck and 9 tons 8x8 heavy off-road truck.

During the 1976 the plan for 1.5 tons 4x4 off-road truck was realized by Tovarna avtomobilov Maribor with TAM 110 T7 B/BV. It was developed from Magirus-Deutz design.

The TAM 110 T7 B/BV was mass-produced for the needs of the Yugoslav People's Army from 1976 until 1991.

Variants
The standard variant is with short cab with canvas and standard cargo bed. Used for transport of personnel (12 + 2 troops with equipment), materials and as tractor for light artillery and anti-aircraft artillery weapons.

The variant with hardtop cab is used for different bodyworks - mobile NBC laboratory (AL-RH), communications vehicle, ambulance (S-4), 4.5t mobile crane (HAK), platform for well drill (BMB), fire truck and minibus for 16 passengers.

Serbian army and Serbian Gendarmerie has several TAM 110 T7 B/BV trucks modified in to armored truck known as Ris (Lynx), and special vehicle for anti-riot operations.

Operators
TAM 110 T7 B/BV was mainly produced for the needs of the  Yugoslav People's Army and milicija. Number of vehicles have been exported to several Middle Eastern countries during the 1980s. Saudi Arabia also imported those trucks for its army.
After the breakup of Yugoslavia most vehicles were passed to successor states. Today TAM 110 T7 B/BV are used by militaries of Serbia, Slovenia, Croatia, Bosnia and Herzegovina, Republic of Macedonia and Montenegro. It is also used by special police forces, as Gendarmery.

Technical data

Dimensions
Length - 4850 mm
Width - 2270 mm
Height - 2470
Height without roof and windshield - 1786 mm
Wheelbase - 2850
Cargo bed internal dimensions:
Length - 3020 mm
Width - 2120 mm
Height - 640

Weight
Curb weight - 4505 kg
Weight on-road - 1500 kg
Weight off-road - 2500 kg
Bodywork allowed weight - 2000 kg

Operating data
Max speed - 90 km/h
Speed on 6-8% ground slope - 28 km
Maximum gradient - 67%

Engine
Name - Deutz F 4L 413 FR
Type - Diesel
No. of cylinder - 4 in line
Displacement - 6381 cm3

References 

Military trucks
Military equipment of Yugoslavia